"Stick to Your Guns" is the first single from Sick Puppies' fifth album Fury. It was released on March 31, 2016 through DrillDown Entertainment Group LLC. It is the first single to feature Bryan Scott on vocals and guitars.

Music video
A lyric video was released on March 31, 2016. A music video was released and premiered on May 18, 2016 on Loudwire's website. The music video was directed by Nathan Cox.

Chart performance

References

2016 singles
Sick Puppies songs
2016 songs
Songs written by Emma Anzai